From Then On is the eighth studio album by German DJ Paul van Dyk. It was released on 20 October 2017 through his label Vandit. The album features guest appearances from many artists, including Ronald van Gelderen, Alex M.O.R.P.H., Jordan Suckley, Pierre Pienaar, and Tristan D.

Background
The album consists of 14 songs, including previously released singles "Touched by Heaven", "Everyone Needs Love" and "Stronger Together". Van Dyk spoke of the album, he said "This intensified experience of sights, sounds and sensations will be our next level of entertainment. Paired with music of my upcoming album From Then On, it’s going to be a celebration of trance, life and unity." Van Dyk's first since 2015, the album is a tribute to a crucial moment since 2016 when he went through a rehabilitation process after a near-fatal accident. The album was written by van Dyk when he was on tour, travelling.

Track listing

Digital download

Vinyl

Charts

References

2017 albums
Paul van Dyk albums
Vandit albums